West Bromwich railway station was a station on the Great Western Railway's London Paddington to Birkenhead via Birmingham Snow Hill line. It opened in 1854 and served the town of West Bromwich in the English West Midlands. It was closed along with the line in 1972.

Site Today
West Bromwich town centre's rail link with Birmingham and Wolverhampton was restored in 1999 with the opening of the Midland Metro station known as West Bromwich Central. It wasn't until building work for this project began in the late 1990s that the remaining heavy rail architecture was removed.

References

Disused railway stations in Sandwell
Railway stations in Great Britain opened in 1854
Railway stations in Great Britain closed in 1972
West Bromwich
Former Great Western Railway stations